Andreyev is a common Russian surname. It derives from Andrei, the Russian form of "Andrew", making it roughly equivalent to "Andrews" or "Anderson". The name is also sometimes spelled Andreev, Andreeff, or Andrejew. Its feminine form is Andreyeva, which is also sometimes spelled Andreeva.

Mentions of the surname may refer to:

A
Andrejewa de Skilondz, or Adelaide von Skilondz (1880–1969), Russian opera soprano singer and singing teacher
André Andrejew (1887–1967), French-Russian production designer, a classic of the film decor building
Alexander F. Andreev (born 1939), Russian physicist
Andrew Andreyev (born 1972), Australian lawyer
Andrey Andreyev (politician) (1895–1971), Soviet politician, Politburo member under Stalin
Anatole Andrejew (1914–2013), French scientist, biochemist of Russian origin
Adrian Andreev (born 2001), professional Bulgarian tennis player
Andrey Andreev (born 1974), Russian-British entrepreneur

B
Boris Andreyev (1915–1982), Soviet film actor, People's Artist of the USSR
Boris Andreyev (1940–2021), Soviet cosmonaut

C
Catherine Andreyev (born 1955), British historian at Christ Church Oxford, daughter of Nikolay E.Andreyev

D
Daniil Andreyev (1906–1959), Russian writer, author of ´The Rose of The World´, son of the writer Leonid Andreyev

E
Ekaterina Andreeva (journalist), Russian journalist and television presenter
Ekaterina Andreeva (swimmer) (born 1993), Russian swimmer
Elena Kuchinskaya-Andreeva (born 1984), Russian racing cyclist

H
Halyna Andreyeva (born 1985), Ukrainian beauty pageant contestant

I
Igor Andrejew  (1915–1995), Polish lawyer, author of the Polish Criminal Code from 1969
Igor Andreev (born 1983), Russian tennis player
Iuliia Andreeva (born 1984), Kyrgyzstani long-distance runner

L
Leonid Andreyev (writer) (1871–1919), Russian writer and dramatist, one of the most important Russian modern writers
Leonid Andreyev (doctor) (1891–1941), Soviet physiologist and surgeon
Ljubov Andrejewa-Delmas, (1884- ? ), Russian mezzo-soprano opera singer

M
Maria Andreyeva (1868–1953), Russian/Soviet actress

N
Nadezhda Andreeva Udaltsova (1886–1961), Russian avant-garde artist
Nadezhda Andreyeva (1959–2014), Soviet alpine skier
Nikita Andreev (born 1988), Russian footballer
Nikolai Nikolaevich Andreev (1880–1970), Soviet physicist
Nikolay Andreyev (1873–1932), Russian sculptor and graphic artist, member of Wanderers (Peredvizhniki)
Nikolay Andreyev (critic) (1892–1942), Soviet literary critic and student of folklore
Nikolay Yefremovich Andreyev (historian) (1908–1982), Russian historian medievalist, lector at Cambridge, author of memoirs
Nina Andreyeva (1938–2020), Russian teacher, author and political activist

O
Olga Andrejew Carlisle (born 1931), American writer, granddaughter of the writer Leonid Andrejew, daughter of the poet Vadim Andreyev

P
Paulina Andreeva (born 1988), Russian actress
Pavel Andreyev (1874–1950), Russian bass-baritone opera singer
Paweł Andrejew (1887–1942), Polish attorney of Russian origin
Piotr Andrejew (1947–2017), Polish film director, grandson of Paweł Andrejew

S
Sasha Andreev (born 1981), American actor
Sergey Andreyev (born 1956), Soviet football player and Russian coach
Sergei Andreeyev (born 1970), Uzbekistani football player
Sergei Andrejev (1897–1930), Estonian Communist politician
Stepan Andreyev, 18th-century Russian polar explorer

T
Tatiana Andreeva (born 1970), Soviet figure skater
Teodora Rumenova Andreeva (born 1987), Bulgarian pop-folk singer

V
Vadim Andreyev (born 1958), Russian film and theatre actor
Vadim Andreyev (poet) (1906–1959), Russian poet exiled in Berlin and Paris, author of Childhood, son of Leonid Andreyev
Vasily Andreyev (1861–1918), Russian musician and balalaika virtuoso
Vasily Andreyev-Burlak (1843–1888), Russian actor
Viktoriya Andreyeva (born 1992), Russian swimmer

Ye
Yelena Andreyeva (born 1969), Russian sprinter and medalist at the 1995 World Championships in Athletics

See also
Andreyevka
Andreyevo, Russian places also formerly known as Andreyeva

Bibliography

References

Russian-language surnames
Patronymic surnames
Surnames from given names